This is a list of people depicted on circulating coins throughout the world. Note that this list does not include people who have appeared on banknotes, but not coins, and is of actual people and not deities or fictional persons. The customary design on coins is a portrait of a notable individual (living and/or deceased) on the obverse or reverse, unless the subject is depicted on both sides of the coin.

Elizabeth II, former Queen of the Commonwealth realms and their territories and dependencies, features on more coins than any other person.

Coins in circulation

Albania
Currency:  Lek (since 1926)Subdivision:  QindarkëCurrency Code:  ALLSee also Albanian lek.

Aruba
Currency:  Florin (since 1986)Symbol:  ƒSubdivision:  CentCurrency Code:  AWGSee also Aruban florin.

Australia

Currency:  Dollar (since 1966)Symbol:  $Subdivision:  CentSymbol:  ¢Currency Code:  AUDSee also Australian dollar and Coins of the Australian dollar.

Bahamas, The
Currency: Dollar (since 1966)Symbol: $Subdivision: CentCurrency Code: BSDSee also Bahamian dollar.

Bangladesh
Currency: Taka (since 1972)Symbol: ৳Subdivision: PoyshaCurrency Code: BDTSee also Bangladeshi taka.

Belize
Currency:  Dollar (since 1885)Symbol:  $Subdivision:  CentCurrency Code:  BZDSee also Belize dollar and Coins of the Belize dollar.

Bermuda
Currency:  Dollar (since 1970)Symbol:  $Subdivision:  CentCurrency Code:  BMDSee also Bermudian dollar.

Brazil
Currency:  Real (since 1994)Symbol:  R$Subdivision:  CentavoCurrency Code:  BRLSee also Brazilian real.

Brunei
Currency:  Dollar (since 1967)Symbol:  $Subdivision:  SenCurrency Code:  BNDSee also Brunei dollar and Coins of the Brunei dollar.

Bulgaria
Currency: Lev (plu. leva) (since 1881)Symbol: лв.Subdivision: StotinkaCurrency Code: BGNSee also Bulgarian lev.

Canada
Currency:  Dollar (since 1858)Symbol:  $Subdivision:  CentSymbol:  ¢Currency Code:  CADSee also Canadian dollar, Coins of the Canadian dollar and List of people on coins of Canada

Cayman Islands
Currency:  Dollar (since 1972)Symbol:  $Subdivision:  CentCurrency Code:  KYDSee also Cayman Islands dollar.

Chile
Currency: Peso (since 1975)Symbol: $Subdivision: CentavoCurrency Code: CLPSee also Chilean peso.

Colombia
Currency:  Peso (since 1837)Symbol:  $Subdivision:  CentavoCurrency Code:  COPSee also Colombian peso.

Cook Islands
Currency: Dollar (since 1972)Symbol: $Subdivision: CentCurrency Code: CKD (unofficial)See also Cook Islands dollar.

Cuba
Currency:  Peso (since 1857)Symbol: $Subdivision:  CentavoCurrency Code:  CUPSee also Cuban peso.

Czech Republic
Currency:  Koruna (since 1993)Symbol:  KčSubdivision:  HaléřSymbol:  hCurrency Code:  CZKSee also Czech koruna and Coins of the Czech koruna.

Denmark
Currency:  Krone (since 1873)Symbol:  krSubdivision:  ØreCurrency Code:  DKKSee also Danish krone.

Dominican Republic
Currency:  Peso (since 1844)Symbol:  $Subdivision:  CentavoSymbol:  ¢Currency Code:  DOPSee also Dominican peso.

Eastern Caribbean States
Currency:  Dollar (since 1981)Symbol:  $Subdivision:  CentCurrency Code:  XCDSee also Eastern Caribbean dollar.

Ecuador
Currency: Ecuadorian centavo (since 2000)See also Ecuadorian centavo coins.

European Union
Currency:  Euro (since 2002)Symbol:  €Subdivision:  CentSymbol:  n/aCurrency Code:  EURSee also Euro and Euro coins.

Falkland Islands
Currency: Pound (since 1833)Symbol: 	£Subdivision: PennyCurrency Code: FKPSee also Falkland Islands pound.

Fiji
Currency:  Dollar (since 1969)Symbol:  $Subdivision:  CentCurrency Code:  FJDSee also Fijian dollar.

Guatemala
Currency:  Quetzal (since 1925)Symbol:  QSubdivision:  CentavoCurrency Code:  GTQSee also Guatemalan quetzal.

Guernsey
Currency: Guernsey pound (since 1921)Symbol: 	£Subdivision: PennyCurrency Code: GGP (unofficial)See also Guernsey pound.

Haiti
Currency: Gourde (since 1813)Symbol: GSubdivision: CentimeCurrency Code: HTGSee also Haitian gourde.

Honduras
Currency:  Lempira (since 1931)Symbol:  LSubdivision:  CentavoCurrency Code:  HNLSee also Honduran lempira.

Indonesia
Currency:  Rupiah (since 1945)Subdivision:  SenCurrency Code:  IDRSee also Coins of the rupiah and Indonesian rupiah.

Isle of Man
Currency: Pound (since 1971)Symbol: 	£Subdivision: PennyCurrency Code: IMP (unofficial)See also Manx pound.

Jamaica
Currency:  Dollar (since 1969)Symbol:  $Subdivision:  CentCurrency Code:  JMDSee also Jamaican dollar.

Jersey
Currency: Jersey pound (since 1837)Symbol: 	£Subdivision: PennyCurrency Code: JEP (unofficial)See also Jersey pound.

Jordan
Currency:  Dinar (since 1949)Subdivision:  Qirsh or PiastreCurrency Code:  JODSee also Jordanian dinar.

Kenya
Currency:  Shilling (since 1966)Subdivision:  CentCurrency Code:  KESSee also Kenyan shilling.

Lesotho
Currency: Loti (pl. Maloti) (since 1979)Symbol: L or M (pl.)Subdivision: SenteCurrency Code: LSLSee also Lesotho loti.

Mexico
Currency:  Peso (since 1821)Symbol:  $Subdivision:  CentavoSymbol:  ¢Currency Code:  MXNSee also Mexican peso.

Mongolia
Currency:  Tögrög (since 1925)Symbol:  ₮Subdivision:  MöngöCurrency Code:  MNTSee also Mongolian tögrög.

Morocco
Currency:  Dirham (since 1882)Symbol:  د.م.Subdivision:  SantimCurrency Code:  MADSee also Moroccan dirham.

New Zealand
Currency:  Dollar (since 1967)Symbol:  $Subdivision:  CentSymbol:  cCurrency Code:  NZDSee also New Zealand dollar and Coins of the New Zealand dollar.

Nigeria
Currency:  Naira (since 1973)Symbol:  ₦Subdivision:  KoboCurrency Code:  NGNSee also Nigerian naira.

Norway
Currency:  Krone (since 1875)Symbol:  krSubdivision:  ØreCurrency Code:  NOKSee also Norwegian krone.

Pakistan
Currency:  Rupee (since 1947)Symbol:  Rs.Subdivision:  PaisaCurrency Code:  PKRSee also Pakistani rupee.

Panama
Currency: Balboa (since 1904)Symbol: B/.Subdivision: CentésimoCurrency Code: PABSee also Panamanian balboa.

Paraguay
Currency:  Guaraní (since 1943)Symbol: Subdivision:  CéntimoCurrency Code:  PYGSee also Paraguayan guaraní.

Philippines
Currency:  Piso (since 1852)Symbol:  ₱Subdivision:  SentimoCurrency Code:  PHPSee also Philippine peso and Coins of the Philippine peso.

Russia
Currency:  Ruble (since 1710)Symbol:  руб/₽Subdivision:  KopekSymbol:  кCurrency Code:  RUBSee also Russian ruble.

Serbia
Currency:  Dinar (since 2003)Symbol:  din.Subdivision:  ParaCurrency Code:  RSDSee also Serbian dinar.

Sierra Leone
Currency: Leone (since 1964)Symbol: LeSubdivision: CentCurrency code: SLESee also Sierra Leonean leone.

Solomon Islands
Currency:  Dollar (since 1977)Symbol:  $Subdivision:  CentCurrency Code: SBDSee also Solomon Islands dollar.

South Korea
Currency:  Won (since 1962)Symbol:  ₩Subdivision:  JeonCurrency Code:  KRWSee also South Korean won.

Republic of China (Taiwan)
Currency:  New Taiwan Dollar (since 1949)Symbol:  $Subdivision:  Jiao, CentCurrency Code:  TWDSee also New Taiwan dollar.

Tajikistan
Currency: Somoni (since 2000)Symbol: SMSubdivision: DiramCurrency Code: TJSSee also Tajikistani somoni.

Thailand
Currency: Baht (since 1925)Symbol: ฿Subdivision: SatangSymbol: stCurrency Code: THBSee also Thai baht.

Tonga
Currency: Paʻanga (since 1967)Symbol: T$ Subdivision: SenitiCurrency Code: TOPSee also Tongan paʻanga.

Transnistria
Currency: Ruble (since 1994)Symbol: Subdivision: KopeckCurrency Code: PRB or RUP (unofficial)See also Transnistrian rubla.

Ukraine
Currency: Hryvnia (pl. Hryvni and Hryven) (since 1996)Symbol: ₴Subdivision: KopiykaCurrency Code: UAHSee also Coins of the Ukrainian hryvnia and Ukrainian hryvnia.

United Kingdom
Currency:  Pound Sterling (since 1158)Symbol:  £Subdivision:  PennySymbol:  pCurrency Code:  GBPSee also Coins of the pound sterling and Pound sterling.

United States
Currency:  Dollar (since 1792)Symbol:  $Subdivision:  CentSymbol:  ¢Currency Code:  USDSee also Coins of the United States dollar and United States dollar.

Venezuela
Currency: Bolívar (since 1879)Symbol: Bs.Subdivision: CéntimoCurrency Code:  VEDSee also Venezuelan bolívar.

Coins no longer in circulation

Albania
Currency/Subdivision: Lek/qindarkë

Argentina
Currency/Subdivision:  Peso Moneda Nacional (m$n, 1881–1969)/Centavo (¢)Currency/Subdivision:  Peso Ley ($L, 1970–1983)/Centavo (¢)Currency/Subdivision:  Peso Argentino ($a, 1983–1985)/Centavo (¢)Currency/Subdivision:  Austral (A, 1985–1991)/Centavo (¢)Currency/Subdivision:  Peso ($, 1992–Present)/Centavo (¢)Currency Codes:  ARM, ARL, ARP, ARA, ARSSee also Argentine peso moneda nacional, Argentine peso ley, Argentine peso argentino, Argentine austral, and Argentine peso.

Australia
Currency/Subdivision:  Pound (£, 1813–1966)/Penny (d)Currency/Subdivision:  Dollar ($, 1966–Present)/Cent (c)Currency Code:  AUDSee also Australian pound, Australian dollar, Coins of the Australian pound and Coins of the Australian dollar.

Belgium
Currency/Subdivision:  Franc (fr., 1832–Present)/Centime (c.)Currency Code:  BELSee also Belgian franc.

Brunei
Currency/Subdivision:  Dollar ($, 1967–Present)/SenCurrency Code:  BNDSee also Brunei dollar and Coins of the Brunei dollar.

Canada
Currency/Subdivision:  Dollar ($, 1858–Present)/Cent (¢)Currency Code:  CADSee also Canadian dollar and Coins of the Canadian dollar.

Cook Islands
Currency: Dollar (since 1972)Symbol: $Subdivision: CentCurrency Code: CKD (unofficial)See also Cook Islands dollar.

Cyprus
Currency:  Pound (1879-2008)Symbol:  £Subdivision:  Cent and MilCurrency Code:  CYPSee also Cypriot pound and Coins of the Cypriot pound.

Czechoslovakia
Currency/Subdivision:  Koruna (Kčs, 1919–1939 and 1945–1993)/Haléř or Halier (h)Currency Code:  CSKSee also Czechoslovak koruna.

Fiji
Currency/Subdivision:  Pound (£, 1934–1969)/PennyCurrency/Subdivision:  Dollar ($, 1969–Present)/CentCurrency Code:  FJDSee also Coins of the Fijian pound, Fijian pound and Fijian dollar.

France
Currency: French franc (1795-2001)/Subdivision: CentimeSee also French franc.

Germany
  Currency/Subdivision:  Reichsmark (ℛℳ, 1924–1945)/Reichspfennig (rpf.)Currency/Subdivision:  Deutsche Mark (DM, 1948–2002)/Pfennig (Pf.)Currency Code:  DEMSee also German mark and Reichsmark.

Greece
Currency/Subdivision:  Drachma (Δρ., 1832–2001)/Lepto (n/a)Currency Code:  GRDSee also Greek drachma.

Hungary
Currency/Subdivision:  Korona (K, 1919–1926)/FillérCurrency/Subdivision:  Pengő (P, 1927–1946)/FillérCurrency/Subdivision:  Forint (Ft, 1946–Present)/FillérCurrency Code:  HUFSee also Coins of the Hungarian pengő, Coins of the Hungarian forint, Hungarian pengő and Hungarian forint.

India (British Raj)
Currency/Subdivision:  RupeeSee also Indian rupee.

Jordan
Currency/Subdivision:  Dinar (1949–Present)/Qirsh or Piastre and FilsCurrency Code:  JODSee also Jordanian dinar.

Kenya
Currency/Subdivision:  Shilling (1966–Present)/CentCurrency Code:  KESSee also Kenyan shilling.

Liechtenstein
Currency/Subdivision:  Krone (1898-1921)/HellerFranc (Franken) (1920–present)/Centime (Rappen)See also Liechtenstein krone and Liechtenstein franc.

Mexico
Currency/Subdivision:  Peso ($, 1821–Present)/Centavo (¢)Currency Code:  MXP (1821–1993) and MXN (1993–Present)See also Mexican peso.

Monaco
Currency: Monégasque franc (1837-1995)/Subdivision: CentimeSee also Monégasque franc.

Morocco
Currency/Subdivision:  Dirham (1882–Present)/SantimCurrency Code:  MADSee also Moroccan dirham.

Netherlands
Currency/Subdivision:  Gulden (ƒ, 1817–2002)/Cent (ct.)Currency Code:  NLGSee also Dutch gulden.

Newfoundland, Dominion of
Currency/Subdivision: Dollar ($/NF$, 1865-1949)/Cent (¢ )See also Newfoundland dollar.

New Zealand
Currency/Subdivision:  Pound (£, 1840–1967)/Penny (d)Currency/Subdivision:  Dollar ($, 1967–Present)/Cent (c)Currency Code:  NZDSee also New Zealand pound, New Zealand dollar and Coins of the New Zealand dollar.

Nigeria
Currency/Subdivision:  Pounds (£, 1959–1973)/Shilling (/-) and pence (d)Currency/Subdivision:  Naira (₦, 1973–Present)/KoboCurrency Code:  GBP, NGNSee also Nigerian pound and Nigerian naira.

Romania
Currency/Subdivision:  Romanian leu (L, 1867–Present)/ban (b)Currency Code:  ROLSee also Romanian leu.

Sarawak, Raj of
Currency/Subdivision:  Dollar ($, 1858-1953)/CentSee also Sarawak dollar.

South Africa
Currency/Subdivision:  Pound (£, 1923–1961)/Penny (d)Currency/Subdivision:  Rand (R, 1961–Present)/Cent (c)Currency Code:  ZARSee also Coins of the South African pound, Coins of the South African rand, South African rand and South African pound.

South Korea
Currency/Subdivision:  Won (1945–1953)/JeonCurrency/Subdivision:  Hwan (1953–1962)/JeonCurrency/Subdivision:  Won (1962–Present)/JeonCurrency Code:  KRWSee also South Korean won (1945), South Korean hwan, and South Korean won.

Soviet Union
Currency/Subdivision:  Ruble (руб, 1917–1991)/Kopek (к)Currency Code:  SURSee also Soviet ruble.

Thailand
Currency/Subdivision:  Tical (1857–1925)/Satang (st)Currency/Subdivision:  Baht (฿, 1925–Present)/Satang (st)Currency Code:  THBSee also Thai baht.

United Kingdom

United States
Currency/Subdivision:  Dollar ($, 1792–Present)/Cent (¢)Currency Code:  USDSee also Coins of the United States dollar, Template:Obsolete U.S. currency and coinage and United States dollar.

References

 
Coins